John Wesley Coombs (November 18, 1882 – April 15, 1957), nicknamed "Colby Jack" after his alma mater, was an American professional baseball player. He played in Major League Baseball as a pitcher for the Philadelphia Athletics (1906–14), Brooklyn Robins (1915–18), and Detroit Tigers (1920). In 1910, Coombs won 31 games during the regular season and three games in the World Series to lead the Athletics to the championship. A two-way player, he also occasionally played as an outfielder.

Early life
Born in LeGrand, Iowa, Coombs moved to Kennebunk, Maine with his family at the age of four. He played baseball in high school in Freeport, Maine, and in 1901–02 for Coburn Classical prep school in Waterville. Coombs was a 1906 graduate of Colby College in Waterville, where he was a chemistry major and a member of Delta Upsilon. He also participated in football, track, and tennis. Colby's baseball field is named for him.

Baseball career
Three weeks after graduating, Coombs pitched in his first major league game for the Philadelphia Athletics, a seven-hit shutout, defeating the Washington Senators 3–0. He finished 1906 with a 10–10 record and 2.50 earned run average. In 1906, he pitched the longest complete game in the American League, 24 innings against Boston, winning 4–1. The following year, Coombs went 6–9 with a 3.12 ERA. In 1908 and 1909, his record was only 19–16 despite his ERA being 2.00 and 2.32 those years.

Coombs' best season was 1910, which is still one of the best pitching seasons in MLB history. Besides his record of 31–9, he had an ERA of 1.30 and led the American League in wins (31), games played (45), and shutouts (13), which is still the single-season AL record. He won 18 of 19 starts that July and racked up 53 consecutive scoreless innings, which stood as the major league record until Walter Johnson broke it three years later. Don Drysdale and Orel Hershiser later surpassed Johnson's mark. Coombs became one of only 13 pitchers to win 30 games in a season since 1900. He then won three games in the 1910 World Series, in which the Athletics defeated the Chicago Cubs.

In 1911, Coombs led the AL in wins again with 28, even though his ERA went up to 3.53. He won one game in the 1911 World Series, as the Athletics repeated as champions. The following year, he won 21 games.

Coombs did not play much in 1913 and 1914. The Athletics released him, and he signed with the Brooklyn Robins, for whom he played from 1915 to 1918. In the 1916 World Series, he won a game, but the Robins lost the series.

In 1919, Coombs was the manager of the Philadelphia Phillies for 62 games, going 18–44 before being replaced by Gavvy Cravath. He returned to play one final year in 1920 for the Detroit Tigers before retiring. Coombs finished his MLB career with a 158–110 record, a 2.78 ERA, and 1,052 strikeouts.

Coombs was an adept hitting pitcher in his 14-year major league career, compiling a .235 batting average (261-for-1110) with 4 home runs, 123 runs scored, and 100 runs batted in. He played 62 games in the outfield during his career. In six World Series games, he hit .333 (8-for-24) with 4 RBI.

Later life
Coombs became a championship-winning coach at Duke University (1929–52) who sent many players to the majors. Duke University's baseball field is named after him.

Coombs spent his retirement as a sports historian and writer.  In 1938, he published Baseball – Individual Play and Team Strategy.

Head coaching record

Films

World's Championship Series (1910) *docu. short
The Baseball Bug (1911) *short
Animated Weekly, No. 41 (1916) *docu. short
World Series Games 1916, Boston vs. Brooklyn (1916) *documentary
The Baseball Revue of 1917 (1917) *documentary

See also
 List of Major League Baseball annual wins leaders
 List of Major League Baseball annual shutout leaders
 List of members of the North Carolina Sports Hall of Fame
 Philadelphia Baseball Wall of Fame

References

External links

, or Cuban-American Major League Clubs Series, or Retrosheet, or SABR Biography Project, The Baseball Cube, or The DeadBall Era

1882 births
1957 deaths
American League wins champions
Baseball players from Iowa
Brooklyn Robins players
Colby Mules baseball players
Detroit Tigers coaches
Detroit Tigers players
Duke Blue Devils baseball coaches
Major League Baseball pitchers
Montpelier-Barre players
People from Kennebunk, Maine
People from Le Grand, Iowa
Philadelphia Athletics players
Philadelphia Phillies managers
Rice Owls baseball coaches